New Salisbury is an unincorporated census-designated place (CDP) in Jackson Township, Harrison County, Indiana, United States. As of the 2010 census it had a population of 613.

Businesses in New Salisbury include two gas stations, two grocery stores, a drug store, a bank, a veterinarian's office, doctor offices, a transport company, and a manufacturing company. The area is within the North Harrison Community School Corporation.

The area has submitted to the state of Indiana to be incorporated. If approved, New Salisbury would be the fourth largest town in Harrison County. Currently the area is governed by the Harrison County government and represented by a council member on the County Council.

History
New Salisbury was platted in 1839 by John Kepley. It was named for Kepley's former hometown of Salisbury, North Carolina.

The town was sacked during Morgan's Raid by the main body of the Confederate Army as it advanced north toward Palmyra where it camped the night of July 9, 1863.

Demographics

References

Census-designated places in Harrison County, Indiana
Census-designated places in Indiana
Louisville metropolitan area
Populated places established in 1839
1839 establishments in Indiana